Amesbury is a town and civil parish in Wiltshire, England.

Amesbury may also refer to:

Places
 Amesbury railway station, Amesbury, England
 Amesbury Priory, England
 Amesbury, Massachusetts, US
 Amesbury (CDP), Massachusetts, a US census-designated place
 Amesbury, Alberta, Canada
 Amesbury, Toronto, Ontario, Canada

Schools
 Amesbury School, Surrey, England
 Amesbury Public Schools, Massachusetts, US
 Amesbury High School, Amesbury, Massachusetts, US
 Amesbury Middle School, Amesbury, Massachusetts, US

People
 Alexia Amesbury (born 1951), Seychellois politician and lawyer 
 Barbra Amesbury (born 1948, also known as Bill Amesbury), Canadian philanthropist, singer-songwriter, composer, filmmaker
 Charlie Amesbury, (born 1986) British rugby union footballer
 Mike Amesbury (born 1969), British politician
 Charles Dundas, 1st Baron Amesbury (1751–1832), British politician, Baron Amesbury
 Amesbury Archer ( 2300 BC), skeleton found in Amesbury, England

Other uses
 Amesbury Town F.C., Amesbury, England
 Amesbury Abbey, Amesbury, England
 USS Amesbury (DE-66), Buckley-class destroyer escort of the US Navy
 

English-language surnames
Disambiguation pages with surname-holder lists